is a Fukui Railway Fukubu Line railway station located in the city of Fukui, Fukui Prefecture, Japan.

Lines

Station layout
The station consists of one ground-level side platform serving a single bi-directional track. The station is unattended.

Adjacent stations

History
The station opened on July 26, 1925. In July 1950 the Fukubu Line double-tracked from this station to Fukui-Shin Station. Freight operations were abolished in 1977.

Surrounding area
 Immediately to the west is Prefectural Route 299 (Phoenix-dōri); many trucking companies line the road nearby.
 Fukui Municipal Fire Department – Minami Fire Station
 Ministry of Land, Infrastructure, and Transport – Chubu District Transport Bureau, Fukui Transport Branch Office
 JR West Echizen-Hanandō Station is located approximately 300 meters to the east.

See also
 List of railway stations in Japan

External links

  

Railway stations in Fukui Prefecture
Railway stations in Japan opened in 1925
Fukui Railway Fukubu Line
Fukui (city)